Clitheroe was a parliamentary constituency in Lancashire.

The town of Clitheroe was first enfranchised as a parliamentary borough in 1559, returning two Members of Parliament (MPs) to the House of Commons of England until 1707, then to the House of Commons of Great Britain until 1800, and finally to the House of Commons of the Parliament of the United Kingdom until 1832.  The borough's representation was reduced to one MP by the Reform Act 1832.

The parliamentary borough was abolished under the Redistribution of Seats Act 1885, and the name transferred to a new county division with effect from the 1885 general election. The county division returned one MP until it was abolished for the 1983 general election. It was then largely replaced by the new Ribble Valley constituency.

Boundaries 
1885–1918: The Boroughs of Clitheroe and Burnley, the Sessional Division of Colne, and parts of the Sessional Divisions of Clitheroe and Burnley.

1918–1950: The Borough of Clitheroe, the Urban Districts of Great Harwood and Padiham, the Rural District of Clitheroe, and part of the Rural District of Burnley.

1950–1983: The Borough of Clitheroe, the Urban Districts of Great Harwood, Longridge, and Padiham, the Rural Districts of Burnley and Clitheroe, and in the Rural District of Preston the parishes of Dutton, Hothersall, and Ribchester.

Members of Parliament

Borough of Clitheroe

MPs 1559–1660

MPs 1660–1832 
Two members returned to Parliament

MPs 1832–1885

Clitheroe division of Lancashire

MPs 1885–1983

Election results

Elections in the 1970s

Elections in the 1960s

Elections in the 1950s

Elections in the 1940s

Elections in the 1930s

Elections in the 1920s

Elections in the 1910s

Elections in the 1900s

Elections in the 1890s

Elections in the 1880s

 Caused by Kay-Shuttleworth's appointment as Chancellor of the Duchy of Lancaster.

Elections in the 1870s

Elections in the 1860s

 Caused by Fort's death.

Elections in the 1850s

 Caused by the previous by-election being declared void on petition, due to treating.

 Caused by the previous election being declared void on petition, due to bribery, corruption and intimidation.

Elections in the 1840s

Wilson's election at the 1841 general election was declared void and Cardwell was declared elected on 21 March 1842.

Elections in the 1830s

References 

Parliamentary constituencies in North West England (historic)
Constituencies of the Parliament of the United Kingdom established in 1559
Constituencies of the Parliament of the United Kingdom disestablished in 1983
Clitheroe
Politics of Ribble Valley